Charles Gene "J. R." Phillips (born April 29, 1970) is an American former professional baseball player who played first base in the Major Leagues from -.

Major league career
Phillips was selected on waivers by the San Francisco Giants in 1992 and made his Major league debut with the team following September call-ups on September 3, 1993.

After consecutive 27 home run seasons with the Giants' Triple-A farm team, the Phoenix Firebirds, Phillips was named the Giants starting first baseman going into the  season, but his lack of production at the big league level forced him into a platoon with Mark Carreon before mid-season. He hit a career-high 9 home runs and 28 RBIs, while hitting .195 over 231 at bats in 92 games. In the beginning of the  season, Phillips was traded to the Philadelphia Phillies.

He bounced between the minors and the majors over the next four seasons, playing for the Phillies, the Houston Astros and, finally, the Colorado Rockies. He managed to hit two more home runs but ended up playing his final game on October 3, 1999, against the Giants.

Phillips can be classified as a AAAA-type player: one who had great success in the Minor leagues but failed to translate that success in the majors.

References

External links
, or Korea Baseball Organization, or Pura Pelota (VPBL stats)

1970 births
Living people
Águilas Cibaeñas players
American expatriate baseball players in the Dominican Republic
American expatriate baseball players in Mexico
American expatriate baseball players in South Korea
Baseball players from California
Bend Bucks players
Boise Hawks players
Carolina Mudcats players
Charlotte Knights players
Colorado Rockies players
Colorado Springs Sky Sox players
Corpus Christi Hooks players
Houston Astros players
Hyundai Unicorns players
KBO League infielders
Leones de Yucatán players
Leones del Caracas players
American expatriate baseball players in Venezuela
Major League Baseball first basemen
Major League Baseball outfielders
Mexican League baseball first basemen
Mexican League baseball left fielders
Mexican League baseball right fielders
Midland Angels players
New Orleans Zephyrs players
Palm Springs Angels players
People from Covina, California
Philadelphia Phillies players
Phoenix Firebirds players
Quad Cities Angels players
Round Rock Express players
San Francisco Giants players
Scranton/Wilkes-Barre Red Barons players
Sultanes de Monterrey players
Tacoma Rainiers players